Indanorex (Dietor) is a stimulant drug which was developed in the 1970s. It has appetite suppressant effects  and also has antihypoglycemia effects.

Synthesis: Patents:

See also 
 Aminoindane
 ALPHA_(psychedelic)

References 

Tertiary alcohols
Anorectics
Indanes
Stimulants
Norepinephrine-dopamine releasing agents